Karl Abraham Freiherr von Zedlitz und Leipe (January 4, 1731 – March 18, 1793) was a Prussian minister of education who was instrumental in establishing mandatory education in Prussia, which served as a model for the public education system in the United States.

Biography
Zedlitz was born in Schwarzwaldau in Silesia (now Czarny Bór, Lower Silesian Voivodeship, Poland). After his education at the Military Academy in Brandenburg an der Havel, he took a civil service position as clerk in the Chamber Court in 1755. In 1759 he took a position in the Oberamt Government in Breslau. In 1764 he became the president of the Government of Silesia; in 1770 he became the Secretary of State and Minister of Justice. In 1771 he was in charge of the criminal department, oversaw the entire spiritual department, and was in charge of school supplies.

In 1779 he was entangled in Miller Arnold case, a cause célèbre during the reign of Frederick II.
 
A follower of Immanuel Kant's philosophy, he promoted education and a free spiritual direction for people in the higher schools. Kant's 1781 Critique of Pure Reason opens with a dedication to Zedlitz, keeping with the common eighteenth century practice of dedicating philosophical works to prominent patrons. In 1788, Zedlitz lost the spiritual department when Johann Christoph von Wollner was transferred. Zedlitz resigned from government service. In 1788 and 1789 he was director of the Knight's Academy in Liegnitz. He died on his estate in Kapsdorf.

References
Carl Rethwisch: Zedlitz, Karl Abraham Freiherr von .  In: General German Biography (ADB).  44th Volume  Duncker & Humblot, Leipzig 1898, p. 744-748.

1731 births
1793 deaths
People from Wałbrzych County
People from Prussian Silesia
Education ministers of Prussia
Justice ministers of Prussia
Immanuel Kant